Walter John Baggett (29 May, 1902 – 21 July, 1978) was an English footballer who played in the Football League for Bolton Wanderers and Reading.

References

1902 births
1978 deaths
English footballers
Association football forwards
English Football League players
Wolverhampton Wanderers F.C. players
Bolton Wanderers F.C. players
Reading F.C. players
Colwyn Bay F.C. players
Tunbridge Wells F.C. players